William Henry Hutchins (1843 – May 19, 1898) was a grain merchant and political figure in Ontario, Canada. He represented Middlesex North in the House of Commons of Canada from 1891 to 1896 as a Conservative member.

He was born in Stormont County, Canada West. He married a Miss Armitage. Hutchins was reeve for Lucan and served as the first mayor of Parkhill. He was defeated when he ran for reelection in 1896.

References 

The Canadian parliamentary companion, 1891, AJ Gemmill

1843 births
1898 deaths
Members of the House of Commons of Canada from Ontario
Conservative Party of Canada (1867–1942) MPs
Mayors of places in Ontario